Unique Acropolis is expected to be one of the tallest skyscrapers in Bangladesh and the third-tallest building in Dhaka. It is located on Gulshan Avenue, in the commercial centre of Dhaka. It was planned to be completed in 2020.

Facilities
The tower will have the following facilities:
 Serviced apartments
 Hyatt Hotel
 7 basement car parking for more than 800 cars
 Office Block

See also
 List of tallest buildings in Dhaka
 List of tallest buildings in Bangladesh
 List of tallest buildings and structures in the Indian subcontinent
 List of tallest buildings and structures in the world by country
 Bangladesh Bank Building

References

Proposed buildings and structures in Bangladesh
Buildings and structures in Dhaka